The following is a comprehensive list of orders, decorations, and medals bestowed by the Sovereign Military Order of Malta, both in the present-day and historically.

Sovereign Military Hospitalier Order of Saint John of Jerusalem, of Rhodes and of Malta

Blog containing photographs of Medals, neck crosses and sashs for Knights & Dames. (in Portugese)

First Class (Knights of Justice and Conventual Chaplains) 
 Venerable Bailiff Knights Grand Cross of Justice Professed of Solemn Vows
 Knights Grand Cross of Justice Professed of Solemn Vows
 Commanders of Justice Professed of Solemn Vows
 Knights of Justice Professed of Solemn Vows
 Knights of Justice Professed of Simple Vows
 Knights admitted to the Novitiate
 Conventual Chaplains Grand Cross Professed of Solemn Religious Vows
 Conventual Chaplains Professed of Solemn Religious Vows
 Conventual Chaplains Professed of Simple Religious Vows

Second Class (Knights and Dames in Obedience)
 Bailiff Knights Grand Cross in Obedience
 Knights and Dames Grand Cross in Obedience
 Knights and Dames in Obedience

Third Class – First Category (Knights and Dames of Honour and Devotion)

 Bailiff Knights Grand Cross of Honour and Devotion with Profession Cross ad honorem
 Bailiff Knights Grand Cross of Honour and Devotion
 Knights and Dames Grand Cross of Honour and Devotion
 Knights of Honours and Devotion owner of Commandery of Family Patronage
 Knights and Dames of Honour and Devotion
 Bailiff Knights Grand Cross of Honour and Devotion for Cardinals of the Holy Roman Church

Third Class – Second Category (Conventual Chaplains ad honorem) 
 Conventual Chaplains Grand Cross ad honorem
 Conventual Chaplains ad honorem

Third Class – Third Category (Knights and Dames of Grace and Devotion) 
 Knights Grand Cross of Grace and Devotion with Sash
 Knights and Dames Grand Cross of Grace and Devotion
 Knights and Dames of Grace and Devotion

Third Class – Fourth Category (Magistral Chaplains) 
 Magistral Chaplains

Third Class – Fifth Category (Knights and Dames of Magistral Grace)
 Knights Grand Cross of Magistral Grace with Sash
 Knights and Dames Grand Cross of Magistral Grace
 Knights and Dames of Magistral Grace

Third Class – Sixth Category (Donats of Devotion) 
 Donats of Devotion

Order pro Merito Melitensi

Collar of the Order pro Merito Melitensi

 Collar pro Merito Melitensi - Military Class
 Collar pro Merito Melitensi - Civilian Class
 (Single grade, usually reserved for Heads of State)

Cross of the Order pro Merito Melitensi

Military Class
 Grand Cross with Swords pro Merito Melitensi – special class
 Grand Cross with Swords pro Merito Melitensi
 Grand Officer Cross with Swords pro Merito Melitensi
 Commander Cross with Swords pro Merito Melitensi
 Officer Cross with Swords pro Merito Melitensi
 Cross with Swords pro Merito Melitensi

Civilian Class - Gentlemen
 Grand Cross pro Merito Melitensi – special class
 Grand Cross pro Merito Melitensi
 Grand Officer Cross pro Merito Melitensi
 Commander Cross pro Merito Melitensi
 Officer Cross pro Merito Melitensi
 Cross pro Merito Melitensi

Civilian Class - Ladies
 Grand Cross pro Merito Melitensi - special class
 Grand Cross pro Merito Melitensi
 Cross pro Merito Melitensi with Badge
 Cross pro Merito Melitensi with Crown
 Cross pro Merito Melitensi with Shield
 Cross pro Merito Melitensi

Ecclesiastical Class
 Grand Cross pro Piis Meritis Melitensi
 Cross pro Piis Meritis Melitensi

Medal of the Order pro Merito Melitensi

Old style (1920–1960)
 Gold Medal pro Merito Melitensi
 Silver Medal pro Merito Melitensi
 Bronze Medal pro Merito Melitensi

Military Class
 Gold Medal with Swords pro Merito Melitensi
 Silver Medal with Swords pro Merito Melitensi
 Bronze Medal with Swords pro Merito Melitensi

Civilian Class
 Gold Medal pro Merito Melitensi
 Silver Medal pro Merito Melitensi
 Bronze Medal pro Merito Melitensi

Awards for Humanitarian Relief & Emergencies 
 Silver Medal for the Calabria and Sicily earthquake (April 24th 1912)
 Bronze Medal for the Calabria and Sicily earthquake (April 24th 1912)
 Silver Medal for the Turkey War (April 24th 1912)
 Bronze Medal for the Turkey War (April 24th 1912)
 Merit Medal for assistance to the 1940–1945 War Veterans
 Silver Medal for assistance to the Hungarian Refugees
 Bronze Medal for assistance to the Hungarian Refugees
 Medal for relief activities in Vietnam
 Bronze medal commemorating the 900th anniversary of the recognition of the SMOM by Pope Paschal II (1113–2013)
 SMOM Commemorative Medal for the Solemn Exposition of the Holy Shroud in Turin in 2015 (SMOM Magisterial Decree No. 15421 of 12/13 October 2015, medal not portative & ribbon exclusively portative on SMOM Uniforms "from Pilgrimage")
 SMOM Campaign Medal (2022) for medical personnel with clasp

Malteser International
 Malteser International Medal of Merit in Gold
 Malteser International Medal of Merit in Silver
 Malteser International Medal of Merit in Bronze
 Malteser International Medal of Commitment "St. Martin 2007"
 Malteser International Service Medal

Emergency Corps of the Order of Malta
 
 ECOM Medal for Kosovo 1999
 ECOM Medal for Rwanda 2002

Medal and awards of national associations

Malteser Hospitaldienst Austria

 Merit Medal in Gold
 Merit Medal in Silver
 Merit Medal in Bronze
 Medal for the relief of the Kosovo refugees (1999)
 Euro 2008 Medal in Gold
 Euro 2008 Medal in Silver

Malteser in Deutschland – Malteser Hilfsdienst e.V. (Germany)

  Malteser Hilfsdienst long service medal (60 years)
  Malteser Hilfsdienst long service medal (50 years)
  Malteser Hilfsdienst long service medal (40 years)
  Malteser Hilfsdienst long service medal (30 years)
  Malteser Hilfsdienst long service medal (25 years)
  Malteser Hilfsdienst long service medal (20 years)
  Malteser Hilfsdienst long service medal (10 years)
  Malteser Hilfsdienst service medal
 Memorial Medal for the Malteser Hilfsdienst 50th Anniversary Jubilee

 Thanks and Gratitude Medal in Gold
 Thanks and Gratitude Medal in Silver
 Thanks and Gratitude Medal in Bronze

  Memorial ribbon for the World Youth Day 2005 
  Memorial ribbon for the Pope's visit 2006
  Memorial ribbon for the Pope's visit 2011

Order of Malta Federal Association (USA)

  Order of Malta Federal Association USA Pilgrimage for Life Medal
  Order of Malta Federal Association USA Presidential Medal

Order of Malta Irish Association and Ambulance Corps (Republic of Ireland and Northern Ireland)

  Service Medal (10 years)
  Service Medal (20 years)
  Service Medal (30 years)
  Service Medal (40 years)
  Service Medal (50 years)
  900 Year Anniversary Medal (1999)
  Cadet 50th Anniversary Medal (1999)
  Order of Malta Ambulance Corps Gold Jubilee Medal  (1988)
  Lourdes 3 Year Service Medal.
  Lourdes 10 Year Service Medal.
  Papal Visit Medal (1979)
  Papal Visit Medal (2018)
  Rome Pilgrimage Medal (1975)
  Rome Pilgrimage Medal (1984)
  Rome Pilgrimage Medal (2000)
  Poland Pilgrimage Medal (1991)
  Special Olympics 2003 Service Medal
  Order of Malta Ambulance Corps Gold Medal of Merit (1971 model)
  Order of Malta Ambulance Corps Silver Medal of Merit (1971 model)
  Order of Malta Ambulance Corps Bronze Medal of Merit (1971 model)
  Order of Malta Ambulance Corps COVID 19 medal with clasp, possibly a future General Service Medal.

Former Medals
  OMAC Long Service Medal (10 years) (Old)
  OMAC Long Service Medal (20 years) (Old)
  Order of Malta Ambulance Corps Gold Medal of Merit (1943 model)
  Order of Malta Ambulance Corps Silver Medal of Merit (1943 model)
  Order of Malta Ambulance Corps Bronze Medal of Merit (1943 model)

Associazione dei Cavalieri Italiani del Sovrano Ordine di Malta e Corpo Militare dell'Esercito dell'ACISMOM (Italy)

 Medal for the Southern Italy earthquake (1980)
 Medal for the Northern Italy Emergency (2000)
 Medal for the Abruzzo earthquake (1999)

 Memorial Medal of the Redemption Jubilee Pilgrimage (1933)
 Merit Medal for assistance to the Holy Year pilgrims (1975)
 Medal for the assistance to the Redemption Jubilee pilgrims (1983)
 Medal for the assistance to the Redemption Jubilee pilgrims (2000)
  Medal for the assistance to the Mercy Jubilee pilgrims (2016)

 Merit medals for the Lourdes Pilgrimages
 Ribbon for the Malta Order Lourdes Pilgrimages 150th Anniversary
 Pilgrimages Memorial Medal
 Lourdes Pilgrimages Memorial Medal
 Loreto Pilgrimages Memorial Medal

 Memorial Medal for the second millennium from the birth of Saint Paul Apostle of the People (21 November 2009)

 Honour Merit Badge of the Military Corps of the order of Malta, awarded in the Gold, Silver and Bronze classes.

 Memorial Medal of the 1915–1918 War
 Memorial Medal of the 1940–1945 War, awarded in the Silver Class for officers and Bronze Class for other ranks.

 Memorial Medal for the operations in the former Yugoslavia (7 June 1996)

 Long Service Cross for Managers and volunteer nurses (24 October 1941)
 Long Service Cross for NCOs and other ranks (24 October 1941)

Assembly of Portuguese Knights of the Sovereign Military Order of Malta (Portugal) 

 Cruz de Mérito de Frei São Nuno Álvares Pereira

References

External links
The three Classes of the Knights of Malta - official website of the Order of Malta
Sovereign Military Order of Malta in the United Kingdom - Order pro Merito Melitensi
Assembleia dos Cavaleiros Portugueses da Ordem Soberana Militar de Malta, official site of the Assembly of Portuguese Knights of the Sovereign Military Hospital Order of Malta